Kresson may refer to:
Kresson, Baltimore, a neighborhood in Baltimore, Maryland
Kresson, New Jersey, an unincorporated area in Voorhees Township, New Jersey
Kresson Golf Course, a golf course in the area
Kresson Lake, a lake in the area